Newgate Street is a village near Cuffley, in Hatfield civil parish, in the Welwyn Hatfield district of Hertfordshire, England. It is approximately six miles south-west of Hertford and has a population of 400. At the 2011 Census the population was included in the town of Hatfield.

The village has an Anglican church, a school (Ponsbourne St Mary's), a restaurant (The Gables), two pubs (The Crown and The Coach and Horses) and a hotel (Ponsbourne Park Hotel). There is also a small town hall and two outdoor tennis courts.

Originally in the Manor of Tolmers, the present Tolmers Park House dates from 1761. Since World War I it has been used as a military hospital, a girls' boarding school, a geriatric hospital and has now been converted to luxury apartments. Part of the estate became Tolmers Scout Camp in 1940. The house lies just to the South-West of the village.

External links 

 Newgate Street (A Guide to Old Hertfordshire)

Villages in Hertfordshire